Chirundu is a village and border post in Zimbabwe on the border with Zambia, in Mashonaland West province. The name Chirundu means "people following one another in a line or queue" probably referring to the crossing of the Zambezi river by bridge at Chirundu. The village is located on the banks of the Zambezi river, and as a result it lies in the hot Zambezi Valley. It is the site of the Chirundu Bridges, two of only five road or rail bridges across the Zambezi river.

On the Zambian side of the river is a slightly larger town also called Chirundu. The bridge is the principal border crossing for traffic travelling from Harare in Zimbabwe, to Lusaka in Zambia.  Chirundu is surrounded by wildlife/safari areas, elephants frequently wander around the village.  It is also a popular destination for fishing.

Transport
In 2009, a railway branch extension is proposed to this town.

See also
 Railway stations in Zimbabwe
 Chirundu Bridge
 Great North Road (Zambia)

References

Zambia–Zimbabwe border crossings
Zambezi River
Populated places in Mashonaland West Province